40 Golden Greats may refer to:

40 Golden Greats (Cliff Richard album)
40 Golden Greats (Jim Reeves album)